Tapirira is a genus of flowering plants in the family Anacardiaceae.

Species

Selected species
, Plants of the World online has 11 accepted species:

Selected synonyms include:

Tapirira marchandii  — synonym of Tapirira obtusa

References

External links

 
Anacardiaceae genera
Flora of Central America
Flora of North America
Flora of South America